The 2014 Minor Counties Championship was the 110th Minor Counties Cricket Championship season, and the first under the name 'Unicorn Counties Championship'. It was contested through two divisions: Eastern and Western. Staffordshire were the champions for the eleventh time, remaining the most successful club in the history of the competition.

Standings
 Pld = Played, W = Wins, W1 = Win in match reduced to single innings, L = Losses, L1 = Loss in match reduced to single innings, T = Ties, D = Draws, D1 = Draw in match reduced to single innings, A = Abandonments, Bat = Batting points, Bowl = Bowling points, Ded = Deducted points, Pts = Points, Net RPW = Net runs per wicket (runs per wicket for less runs per wicket against).

Teams receive 16 points for a win, 8 for a tie and 4 for a draw. Teams also received 12 points for a win, 6 for a draw and 4 points for losing a match reduced to a single innings. Bonus points (a maximum of 4 batting points and 4 bowling points) may be scored during the first 90 overs of each team's first innings.

Eastern Division

Western Division

Final

Averages

References

2014 in English cricket
2014
Domestic cricket competitions in 2013–14